Causey may refer to:

Places
Causey, England, a village in County Durham, England
Causey Mounth, an ancient drovers' road over the coastal fringe ofAberdeenshire, Scotland
Causey, New Mexico, a village in Roosevelt County, New Mexico, United States
Causey Park Bridge, a village in Northumberland, England
Causey Pike, a fell in the English Lake District
Causey Reservoir, a reservoir in Utah, United States

People
Causey (surname)

Various
The Causey Arch, the world's oldest surviving railway bridge, located near Stanley, County Durham, England
Causey Park House, a 16th-century former manor house at Causey Park Bridge, Northumberland
The Causey Way, a punk/new wave music group from 1997 to 2001
An archaic version of causeway